Hot Country Songs is a chart that ranks the top-performing country music songs in the United States, published by Billboard magazine.  In 1980, 43 different singles topped the chart, then published under the title Hot Country Singles, in 52 issues of the magazine, based on playlists submitted by country music radio stations and sales reports submitted by stores.

In the first issue of Billboard of 1980, Kenny Rogers moved into the number one position with "Coward of the County", his fifth consecutive country number one.  The song went on to tie for the year's longest unbroken run at the top with Ronnie Milsap's double A-sided single "My Heart" / "Silent Night (After the Fight)" and "Lookin' for Love" by Johnny Lee.  All three singles spent three consecutive weeks at number one.  Rogers returned to the top of the country chart later in the year with "Lady", which was a crossover success, also reaching number one on Billboards all-genres chart, the Hot 100.  Rogers was experiencing a lengthy spell of success with smooth sounds which appealed equally to country and pop audiences and established him as a major star in both genres.  Milsap had the most country number ones of any artist in 1980, taking four different singles to the top spot, followed by Mickey Gilley with three.  Milsap's total of six weeks at number one was the most achieved by an individual act.

Cristy Lane reached number one for the first and only time in June with "One Day at a Time".  Another first-time chart topper was the actor Clint Eastwood, who duetted with Merle Haggard on the song "Bar Room Buddies" for the soundtrack of his film Bronco Billy, in which Haggard made a cameo appearance.  Eastwood had made occasional previous forays into music, including the full-length album Rawhide's Clint Eastwood Sings Cowboy Favorites in 1963, but "Bar Room Buddies" was his first ever Hot Country hit.  Ronnie Milsap's number-one song "Cowboys and Clowns" also featured in Bronco Billy.  A song from a film soundtrack also gave Johnny Lee his first number one in 1980, as "Lookin' for Love" was recorded for the film Urban Cowboy.  Mickey Gilley's chart-topping version of "Stand by Me" was taken from the same film, in which Gilley himself appeared, as was "Could I Have This Dance" by Canadian country artist Anne Murray.  The final artist to debut at number one in 1980 was Razzy Bailey with "Loving Up a Storm" in October.  Johnny Lee's second chart-topper of the year, "One in a Million", was the final number one of the year.

Chart history

a.  Double A-sided single

See also
1980 in music
List of artists who reached number one on the U.S. country chart

References

1980
1980 record charts
Country